Hayatabad is a suburb on the western outskirts of Peshawar, the capital of the Khyber Pakhtunkhwa province of Pakistan. It borders the now defunct Tribal Areas and is close to Torkham, which is the major border crossing point between Pakistan and Afghanistan. The suburb is one of the most developed residential society of the town and is home to several of Peshawar's educational, sports and health institutions. Hayatabad is named after Hayat Sherpao, a Pakistani Pashtun politician.

Geography 
Hayatabad was developed as a residential area near Peshawar in the late 1970s. Primarily residential, it also contains an Industrial Estate. 

The government has divided Hayatabad into seven numbered phases. Each phase is subdivided into lettered sectors, A-H. The suburb can be accessed via three routes from Jamrud Road and one from the Ring Road. Hayatabad is the western most terminus of the TransPeshawar bus rapid transit line.

Demographics  
The communities of Hayatabad form a diverse spectrum ranging from locals settled for generations to expatriates on temporary assignments belonging to different ethnicities and cultural backgrounds. Owing to its proximity to Peshawar and the adjoined Industrial Estate, Pashtuns and Persians, as well as Afghan refugees, reside in Hayatabad.

Facilities 

 
Peshawar Development Authority (PDA) is responsible for maintenance and development of the city, including Hayatabad. There are plenty of schools, colleges, universities, hospitals & clinics, parks, shopping malls, international cricket stadiums, futsal grounds and commercial offices in the suburb.

Hospitals
 There are several general and specialized hospitals, along with private practice clinics available. The hospitals are primarily located in Phase 4 and 5, whereas private practice clinics are scattered in almost all phases. A list of hospitals is given below:
 Hayatabad Medical Complex (Phase 4)
Habib Physiotherapy Complex (Phase 5)
Peshawar Institute of Medical Sciences (Phase 5)
 Shaukat Khanum Memorial Cancer Hospital & Research Center (Phase 5)
 Rehman Medical Institute (Phase 5)
 North West General Hospital (Phase 5)
 Peshawar Institute of Cardiology Phase 5.
 Paraplegic center peshawar pase 4 Hayatabad.
 Life Care Hospital Hayatabad Phase 5.
 Peshawar Institute of Medical Sciences (Phase 5)
 Health Net Hospital
 Fountain House, Mental Hospital Hayatabad

Educational institutions
 

Phase 1:

 FAST NUCES, Peshawar Campus (Industrial Estate)
 The City Nursery, Hayatabad

Phase 2:

 International Islamic University Islamabad, Khyber Campus (IIUI)
 Beaconhouse School System Khyber Campus
 Forward Model School 
 IQRA National University

Phase 3:

 Forward Public School 
 Qurtuba University 
 Qurtuba Public School and College 
 The City School Hayatabad Junior

Phase 4:

 Frontier Children's Academy 
 Frontier Youth Academy 
 Frontier Science Academy 
 Hayatabad Model School
 Learning Institute of Modern Sciences 
 Post Graduate Medical Institute (PGMI)
 LIMS School and College

Phase 5:

 Khyber Medical University
 Pak International Medical College 
 Khyber Girls Medical College 
 The City School Peshawar Campus Hayatabad 
 Institute of Public Health and Social Sciences (IPH&SS)
 Institute of Physical Medicine and Rehabilitation (IPM&R)
 Rehman Medical College
 Northwest School of Medicine

Phase 6:

 Beaconhouse School System Frontier Campus
 St. Francis' High School
 CECOS University of IT and Emerging Sciences
 Government Degree College for Boys

Phase 7:

 Institute of Management Sciences (IMSciences)

Parks 

 Bagh-e-Naraan (Phase 1)
 Tatara Park (Phase 1)
Ghani Bagh (Phase 2)
Yousafzai Park (Phase 3)
 Complex Park (Phase 4)
 Khyber Park (Phase 5)
 Shalman Park (Phase 6)
 Bangash Market Park (Phase 6)
 Behram Park (Phase 7)

References

External links 
 Khyber Agency

 
Populated places in Peshawar District